
Raoul is a French variant of the male given name Ralph or Rudolph, and a cognate of Raul.

Raoul may also refer to:

Given name 
 Raoul Berger, American legal scholar
 Raoul Bova, Italian actor
 Radulphus Brito (Raoul le Breton, died 1320), grammarian
 See Lament for the Makaris for Roull of Corstorphin and Roull of Aberdene; fifteenth-century poets
 Raoul de Godewaersvelde, French singer
 Rudolph, Duke of Burgundy; also known as Raoul, Duke of Burgundy (and later king of the Franks), son of Richard of Autun
 Raoul Heertje, Dutch stand-up comedian
 Raoul Moat, English fugitive and gunman at the centre of the 2010 Northumbria Police manhunt
 Raoul of Turenne or Saint-Raoul, archbishop of Bourges, 840–866
 Raoul (founder of Vaucelles Abbey) or Saint Raoul
 Raoul Wallenberg, Swedish humanitarian
 Raoul Walsh (1887–1980), film director
 Raoul, alleged conspirator in the assassination of Martin Luther King Jr.

Surname 
 Raoul (Byzantine family), Byzantine aristocratic family of Norman descent
 Alexios Raoul, Byzantine general
 Theodora Raoulaina (c. 1240–1300), Byzantine noblewoman, nun and scholar
 Étienne Fiacre Louis Raoul (1815–1852), French naval surgeon and naturalist
 Fanny Raoul (1771-1833), French feminist writer, journalist, philosopher and essayist; younger sister of Jean-Marie Raoul
 Jean-Marie Raoul (1766–1837), French lawyer, musician 
 Kwame Raoul (b. 1964), American politician and 42nd Attorney General of Illinois

Fictional characters 
 Viscount Raoul de Chagny, character in The Phantom of the Opera
 Bushman (character) (full name Raoul Bushman), a Marvel Comics character
 Raoul Duke, a recurring character and author surrogate of writer Hunter S. Thompson
 Raoul, one of the main characters of the 2010 animation A Monster in Paris
 Raoul CaRoule from the 2011 animated film Cars 2
 Raoul Silva, the main antagonist in the 2012 film Skyfall, played by Javier Bardem
 Raoul Robideux, one of the main characters of the French–Canadian web series Tetes a Claques
 Raoul Diop, son of protagonist Assane Diop in the Netflix French TV series Lupin

Places
 Raoul, Georgia, United States
 Raoul Island in the Pacific Ocean

Other
Raoul and the Kings of Spain, a 1995 studio album by British group Tears for Fears
"Raoul and the Kings of Spain" (song), the title track from the album
 "Raoul" (song), a 2006 single by indie band The Automatic
 Raoul (EP), an EP by The Automatic

See also
 Raul, a cognate of this name

French masculine given names